Woody Woodpecker (also known as Woody Woodpecker: The Movie) is a 2017 American 3D live-action/computer-animated slapstick comedy film directed by Alex Zamm, based on the cartoon character of the same name created by Walter Lantz. The film stars Timothy Omundson, Graham Verchere, Jordana Largy and Thaila Ayala, and features Eric Bauza as the voice of Woody Woodpecker. The film's plot follows Woody protecting his forest from a real estate lawyer planning to build an investment house in his habitat.

While Woody Woodpecker was filmed in English, it was only released theatrically in the Latin American market, which the film catered to and where the character remains popular. Elsewhere, it was released primarily as a direct-to-video feature.  The film received generally negative reviews from critics, even though the design and animation on Woody received some praise, and grossed $15.3 million. A sequel is in development.

Plot
In the Pine Grove forest in Washington, Woody detects brothers Nate and Ottis Grimes, two taxidermist poachers who attempt to capture and sell him for money, and causes them to tranquilize each other. In Seattle, Lance Walters, a real estate lawyer, gets fired, after a video of him claiming wildlife conservation is unprofitable goes viral. He tells his glamorous girlfriend, Vanessa, that he intends to build an investment home on a large piece of property located near the Canadian border, left to him by his grandfather. Lance's ex-wife Linda leaves their son Tommy with him and Vanessa, since she needs to care for her hospitalized father in Philadelphia.

At the Pine Grove forest, Lance, Tommy, and Vanessa meet park ranger Samantha Bartlett. As Lance and Vanessa unpack, Tommy goes into the forest for a walk. There, he discovers and befriends Woody, after he gives him peanut butter cookies. Woody visits the family at lunchtime, and eats almost all of the food. Lance tries to shoo Woody away, but he accidentally wrecks the table and hits Vanessa in the face with a broom. The next morning, construction on the investment home begins, prompting an angered Woody to constantly cause chaos at the site. Later, in a nearby town, Tommy befriends a young musician named Jill, who persuades him to join her band in the annual Firefly Festival. Tommy is then saved from two bullies by Woody.

As days pass, Lance grows more frustrated, because of Woody's constant annoyance, mischief, chaos, and destruction of his project, and he goes to confront Samantha at the ranger station. She reveals Woody is an endangered species known as the pileated red-crowned woodpecker, which was thought to be extinct for 100 years and Native Americans saw as a god of mischief and chaos. Lance continues with his work, but Vanessa leaves him, after Woody blows up their RV with her inside. Lance tries to get Nate and Ottis, who secretly still plan to sell Woody, to get rid of him, but he keeps outwitting them. Samantha advises Lance to make peace with Woody. Lance attempts to surrender to Woody, by giving him cookies, Woody agrees to let him and the workers continue with their construction, as long as he is given food every day. Eventually, the investment home is completed, despite excessive payment and extended scheduling.

At the town's Firefly Festival, Tommy and Jill's drummer Lyle comes down with food poisoning, prompting Woody to take over using a homemade drum kit. The performance is a success, and Lance is delighted to hear that Woody gave Tommy support. Concluding that having humans around again isn't a bad thing, Woody heads back to the investment home and carves a mural above the fireplace. However, as he signs his name into the carving, he accidentally burns the house down, after hitting exposed wiring. Horrified by his mistake, he flies back to his tree. Thinking Woody was luring him into a false sense of security and furious that he would do this when he was just starting to like him, Lance calls Nate and Ottis, who cut down his tree and tase him unconscious. As they leave, Tommy castigates his father for his actions and runs away. He then forms a plan to rescue Woody and heads to Grimes' shack with Jill and Lyle, as the brothers try to sell Woody at an online black market auction. Lance finds the mural that Woody had created. Realizing his mistake, he enlists Samantha's help and they set out to find both Tommy and Woody. However, the entire gang is captured by the brothers. As Nate aims a tranquilizer on Woody, Lance tilts his cage towards Woody's & frees him. After attacking the brothers, Woody chases them as they attempt to flee to the Canada border. He carves a hole in the middle of the bridge, and the brothers fall into the river below, where they are later arrested.

Later, Lance apologizes to Woody for not knowing that the house fire was an accident and therefore replaces Woody's cut-down tree with a birdhouse. Woody accepts both the gift and the gang as his surrogate family.

Cast
Eric Bauza as the voice of Woody Woodpecker, a rare, manic and cheeky pileated woodpecker.
Graham Verchere as Tommy Walters, the teenage son of Lance. He is Woody's best friend.
Timothy Omundson as Lance Walters, a Seattle lawyer who is the ex-husband of Linda, Tommy's father and Vanessa's boyfriend.
Jordana Largy as Samantha Barlett, the park-ranger of Pine Grove.
Thaila Ayala as Vanessa, Lance's selfish, arrogant, narcissistic, and cold-hearted girlfriend. Ayala was cast to add appeal in Brazil, and in Brazilian dubbing, Ayala voiced herself. 
Adrian Glynn McMorran as Otis Grimes, a slow-witted poacher and partner/younger brother of Nate.
Scott McNeil as Nate Grimes, a cruel poacher who wants to capture and sell Woody in auction.
Chelsea Miller as Jill Ferguson, a teenager bass guitarist who becomes Tommy's friend.
Jakob Davies as Lyle, a  drummer who is Tommy and Jill's friend.
Sean Tyson as George, a builder who directs the building of the new house of Lance.
Emily Holmes as Linda Walters, Lance's ex-wife and mother of Tommy.
Patrick Lubczyk as Chris, a bully who is the partner of John and harasses Tommy but is humiliated by Woody.
Ty Consiglio as John, a bully who also harasses Tommy in one part of the film but is humiliated by Woody.
Karin Konoval as Barbara Krum, the receptionist for Lance.

Production
In November 2011, Universal Pictures and Illumination Entertainment planned an animated Woody Woodpecker feature film. John Altschuler and Dave Krinsky (King of the Hill) were in talks to develop a story, but in July 2013, Illumination canceled the project.

In October 2013, Bill Kopp announced that Universal and Illumination hired him to direct an animated feature film with three interwoven stories.  The project was put on hold and then cancelled, as Chris Meledandri confirmed that its concept was too thin for an 85-minute movie.

On July 13, 2016, Cartoon Brew reported that Universal 1440 Entertainment was filming a live-action/CGI hybrid Woody Woodpecker film, following the success of Alvin and the Chipmunks. It was reported that Zamm was in discussions with Universal executives about what he was interested in directing and co-writing with William Robertson next after The Little Rascals Save the Day, and expressed interest in a Woody Woodpecker movie. Director and co-writer Alex Zamm has also watched all 200 Woody Woodpecker cartoons, as preparation for the movie. For cost-effective reasons, it was agreed upon for the film to have a more singular approach with Woody Woodpecker being the one surreal element as a photorealistic character in the real world. Filming began in June 2016 and ended later in July of that year. Filming was done in Squamish, British Columbia, Canada. The primary audience in mind for the film was that of Brazil. The cartoon has been broadcast in the country for, by 2017, 38 years. The Brazilian newspaper Folha Vitória stated that the series was popular ("com ótima audiência"). In December 2016, a teaser trailer for the film was leaked by Universal Pictures Brazil with the Brazilian Portuguese dub; a trailer for the original English version later premiered in America on December 13, 2017.

Release
The film was first released theatrically in Brazil (under the name of Pica-Pau: O Filme) on October 5, 2017.

In the week of the premiere of the film, a person/people dressed in a costume of the character came to Brazil and visited several cities such as the capital Brasília, Manaus, Olinda, Curitiba, Rio de Janeiro and São Paulo. The highlight visit was when some scenes from the episode "Niagara Fools" were reproduced in the Iguaçu Falls.

Home media
It was released in the United States and Canada on DVD, Digital HD, and Netflix on February 6, 2018 and on Blu-ray on September 4, 2018. The movie was launched on direct-to-video format in the United States and around the world on that day.  In the United Kingdom, the movie was distributed through British home video distributor Dazzler Media, under license from Universal.

Reception

Critical response
Criticism of the film was generally negative. On review aggregator website Rotten Tomatoes, the film has a 13% approval rating based on eight reviews. Common Sense Media rated the film one out of five stars, stating, "Inanely cruel villains, an unoriginal story, ham-handed performances, and reliance on farts and burps are the low lights of this awkward effort to bring back a less-than-engaging cartoon bird." Jodi Smith of entertainment website Pajiba gave the film a negative review, stating "If I was a super villain and I wanted to harm all of the children of the world, I would fund and release a movie like Woody Woodpecker." Conversely, Fernando Alvarez of the Argentine newspaper Clarín referred to the film as "... effective entertainment for a young audience..." in a positive review.

Box office
As of March 11, 2018, Woody Woodpecker has grossed $15.3 million. It debuted at $1.5 million, finishing second at the Brazilian box office behind Blade Runner 2049. The film increased by +45.4% in its second weekend, moving to first place with $2.1 million. The film was never released theatrically in countries other than Latin America.

Sequel
In September 2021, it was announced that Universal began filming a sequel to the film in Victoria, Australia. Filming wrapped on December 12, 2021. The sequel is directed by Jon Rosenbaum and is produced by Jon Kuyper.

References

External links

2017 films
2017 computer-animated films
2017 3D films
2010s children's comedy films
2010s children's animated films
2010s American animated films
American films with live action and animation
American 3D films
American computer-animated films
American slapstick comedy films
American children's animated comedy films
Films based on television series
Films based on animated television series
Films directed by Alex Zamm
Films produced by Mike Elliott
Films shot in British Columbia
Live-action films based on animated series
Animated films about birds
Films about lawyers
Films about animal rights
Woody Woodpecker
Universal Pictures animated films
Universal Pictures films
2017 comedy films
Films set in Washington (state)
2010s English-language films